Subbotnik is an annual international music festival, which takes place in Moscow, Russia.

Overview and history 
Subbotnik became the first musical event of this scale ever held in the territory of Gorky Park. It was organized by the concert agency Pop Farm and corporation PMI together with Gorky Park. It is planned to become an annual event.

Subbotnik 2013 
The first festival held in Gorky Park on Saturday 6 July 2013. Acts for the 2013 edition included Hurts, Foals, Jessie Ware, Savages, Motorama, Kasta, 130 по встречной на старенькой Vespa, Легендарные дефиле 76-го года. The headliner for the 2013 festival was British band Arctic Monkeys, it was the first time they played in Russia.

SVOY Subbotnik 2014 
The festival will be held on Saturday 5 July 2014. The festival will be headlined by Placebo.

Lineups

References

External links
 

Rock festivals in Russia
Music festivals in Russia
Music festivals established in 2013